The Toledo Harbor Lighthouse is a lighthouse in Lake Erie near Toledo, Ohio, in the United States. The light replaced the 1837 lighthouse on Turtle Island at the mouth of the Maumee River. It is an active aid to navigation.

The lighthouse is built on a 20-foot-deep (6 m) stone crib,  from the mouth of the Maumee River, marking the entrance to the Toledo harbor.

The need for a lighthouse became apparent after the shipping channel was widened and deepened in 1897 and shipping traffic increased. Construction began in 1901 when the United States Army Corps of Engineers sunk a large crib, filled it with stone, and then topped the portion above water with a concrete base to create an artificial island.

Crib construction had been perfected on the Great Lakes on such earlier lights as White Shoal Light, Stannard Rock Light, and Rock of Ages Light, which was developed by Engineer Col. Orlando M. Poe.

It has a three-story dwelling and is brick with a steel frame. Its Romanesque style is unique among Great Lakes lighthouses. Built for $152,000, almost as much as Spectacle Reef Light, the most expensive lighthouse on the Great Lakes. The Toledo light was first illuminated on May 23, 1904, by a 3½-order Fresnel lens that featured a 180-degree bull's-eye, two smaller 60-degree bull's-eyes and a ruby-red half cylinder glass made in Paris by Barbier and Bernard.

The engineers next put steel frames in place, providing stability for a three-story brick lighthouse and an attached one-story fog signal building. The dwelling was signed to accommodate one lighthouse keeper and two assistants.  It rises . A cylindrical tower has a diameter of 13 feet, upward from the center of the dwelling roof.  The lantern room measures  in diameter. Helical bars support the glass panes in the onion-domed topped lantern room. The lantern room originally housed an unusual 3 ½-order Fresnel lens manufactured by Barbier & Benard of Paris. The lens featured a 180-degree bull's-eye, two smaller 60-degree bull's-eyes, and a ruby-red half cylinder of glass, and when revolved produced two white flashes followed by a single red flash. A suspended weight was used to rotate the lens, which first sent forth its penetrating beams of light on the night of May 23, 1904.

By 1966, an electric motor was installed to rotate the lens, allowing the Toledo Harbor Lighthouse to operate with little human intervention. The last Coast Guard crew could then be removed, but not before measures were taken to prevent vandalism of the now keeperless lighthouse. The security system came in the form of a fully uniformed mannequin, stationed in one of the upper windows of the dwelling. Originally appearing as a man with a penciled mustache, the mannequin later sported a long blond wig. Ghost stories that tell of a phantom lighthouse keeper at Toledo Harbor can usually be traced back to this figure. Even though it sits motionless, some swear that it has beckoned to them from the window. The mannequin has become part of the Coast Guard's tradition, and new officers stationed at Toledo consider it a rite of passage to sign its shirt.

Toledo Harbor Lighthouse is still an active aid to navigation. The federal government maintained ownership of the site until 2006, and the US Coast Guard still maintains the navigational light. The Toledo Harbor Lighthouse Society, with help from Duket Architects, filed an application to own the lighthouse on September 20, 2005. On October 5, 2006, the Secretary of the Interior approved the Toledo Harbor Lighthouse Preservation Society application for ownership. The lighthouse is open to the public for special events. In the late 1990s, the original Fresnel lens was removed and eventually placed on display at the COSI museum in Toledo. Twice a year, U.S. Coast Guardsmen visit the lighthouse to clean and service the lens, solar panel and backup batteries.

In 1965, the light was automated by the U.S. Coast Guard and powered by solar cells.  To deter vandalism, a uniformed mannequin officer was placed in the window and the boat basin removed.

As part of the commemoration of the light's centennial, the Toledo Harbor Lighthouse Society was formed in 2003 as a nonprofit organization to document the history of the lighthouse, preserve the lighthouse and to provide public access.  The Toledo Harbor Lighthouse Preservation Society was formed to work for restoration of the lighthouse. Restoration will cost approximately $1.5 million. A grant was awarded in 2010 for windows, doors, shutters and tucking the brick.  A 'My Lighthouse Window' capital campaign for the $138,000 match is underway.  The infrastructure will include solar, a marine waste water system and a gray water treatment process.  Potable water will be boated in. When the restoration is complete, four 'keepers' will stay at the lighthouse to schedule visits to tour the lighthouse.

The light's unique form made it the subject of artwork, including paintings.

In 2008, the Fresnel lens was relocated to Quilter Lodge in Maumee Bay State Park, which is within sight of the Toledo Harbor Lighthouse on clear days.

It is listed on the National Register of Historic Places, Reference #83002005, name of Listing: TOLEDO HARBOR LIGHT (U.S. COAST GUARD/GREAT LAKES TR).  It is not on the state list.

References

Further reading
 Oleszewski, Wes. Great Lakes Lighthouses, American and Canadian: A Comprehensive Directory/Guide to Great Lakes Lighthouses, (Gwinn, Michigan: Avery Color Studios, Inc., 1998) .
 U.S. Coast Guard. Historically Famous Lighthouses (Washington, D.C.: Government Printing Office, 1957).
 Wright, Larry and Wright, Patricia. Great Lakes Lighthouses Encyclopedia Hardback (Erin: Boston Mills Press, 2006)

External links 
 
 
 Huelse, Klaus -- Meine Leuchtturm-Seite: Leuchttürme USA auf historischen Postkarten - historic postcard images of U.S. lighthouses, Toledo Harbor Lighthouse
National Historic Lighthouse Preservation Act FACT SHEET (March 7, 2005)
Photographs, Toledo Harbor Light and USS Niagara (museum ship)
Toledo Harbor Lighthouse Society Home Page
Toledo Harbor Lighthouse webcam and meteorological data

Buildings and structures in Lucas County, Ohio
National Register of Historic Places in Lucas County, Ohio
Lighthouses on the National Register of Historic Places in Ohio
Lighthouses completed in 1901
Tourist attractions in Lucas County, Ohio
Transportation in Lucas County, Ohio